Sanna (sometimes Sanda) is an island and village area in the municipality of Træna in Nordland county, Norway. The  island is the largest island in Træna municipality. The Traena Music Festival is held on this island each year. The island has 3 residents (in 2018).

Media gallery

See also
List of islands of Norway

References

Islands of Nordland
Træna